Adem Ljajić (born 29 September 1991) is a Serbian professional footballer who plays as an attacking midfielder for Fatih Karagümrük and the Serbia national team.

Ljajić began his career with FK Jošanica, and later Partizan, with whom he made his debut in the Serbian SuperLiga and UEFA Champions League. In January 2010, he was set to join England's Manchester United, but the club withdrew its option to sign him in December 2009. Instead, he joined Fiorentina for a reported fee of around €8 million in January 2010. In August 2013, after three years in Florence, Ljajić joined Roma for an €11 million fee, signing a four-year contract. In July 2016, he was sold to Torino.

Ljajić made his senior international debut for Serbia in 2010. From 2012 to 2014, he was frozen out of the team by manager Siniša Mihajlović for objecting to singing the Serbian national anthem. He was part of the Serbian squad at the 2018 FIFA World Cup.

Club career

Partizan
Born in Novi Pazar in the Serbian region of the Socialist Federal Republic of Yugoslavia, Ljajić joined Partizan at age 14 in 2005, signing from Serbian lower tier club FK Jošanica. Ljajić was the first player to wear the number 22 for Partizan after Saša Ilić transferred to Galatasaray in 2005. Ljajić made an appearance for Partizan in the first leg of the second qualifying round of the 2008–09 UEFA Champions League on 29 July 2008 as a second-half substitute. He made a second substitute appearance in the second leg and another substitute appearance in the second leg of the third qualifying round. He scored his first competitive goal for Partizan on 23 November 2008 in a league match against OFK Beograd.

In October 2008, Manchester United had given Ljajić a trial, although no information was given about the length of the trial initially. On 2 January 2009, Manchester United announced the signings of both Ljajić and his Partizan teammate, Zoran Tošić. Tošić would join the club immediately while Ljajić would remain at Partizan for the remainder of 2009, joining United in January 2010.

Despite being unable to officially join the club until January 2010, Ljajić made regular trips to Manchester throughout 2009 to train with the United first team, so the club's coaches could monitor his progress. However, United decided not to take up their option to sign Ljajić due to issues surrounding the club's application for a work permit. Following the transfer's collapse, Partizan manager Goran Stevanović claimed the situation had put Ljajić into "psychological shock" but that Ljajić was "handling the situation well". Partizan director of football Ivan Tomić said, "I think that they will regret this decision in future."

Fiorentina

On 13 January 2010, Italian Serie A club Fiorentina announced the signing of Ljajić. After passing a medical, Ljajić signed a five-year contract, with Partizan receiving a reported fee of €8 million for the player. Ljajić made his debut in Fiorentina's 2–2 draw away to Cagliari on 31 January 2010, coming on as an 82nd-minute substitute for Manuel Pasqual. However, his first half-season at the club under head coach Cesare Prandelli was spent settling into the new surroundings.

The arrival of Ljajić's compatriot Siniša Mihajlović as head coach saw increased first-team opportunities for Ljajić. He scored his first Viola goal from the penalty spot against Lazio on 18 September 2010, which Fiorentina lost 1–2.

On 2 May 2012, Ljajić was substituted in a match against Novara. His reaction to this substitution was to sarcastically applaud the manager Delio Rossi, who grabbed and attempted to punch Ljajić. Fiorentina announced after the match that Rossi had been dismissed as manager and that they would take proportionate measures against Ljajić. Ljajić's teammate Valon Behrami, who was on the substitutes' bench at the time of the incident, said no one, including him, had heard Ljajić insult Rossi, which disproved Rossi's claims Ljajić insulted his family. Behrami added Rossi should be ashamed for his actions as well as for lying to the media.

Ljajić scored a brace as La Viola beat Internazionale 4–1 on 17 February 2013.

Roma
Ljajić signed with Roma on 28 August 2013 for a fee of €11 million, potentially rising to €15 million depending on the club's success, with Ljajić signing a four-year contract. He chose the number 8 jersey, left vacant by Erik Lamela, which Ljajić also used with the Serbia national team. On 1 September 2013, Ljajić made his Roma debut in a match against Hellas Verona, replacing Alessandro Florenzi; Ljajić scored the final goal in 3–0 win. In his first season in Rome, Ljajić scored 6 goals in 32 appearances.

On 30 August 2014, Ljajić made his 2014–15 season debut in a 2–0 win for the Giallorossi over Fiorentina. On 24 September, he scored his first goal of the season in a 2–1 Roma victory over Parma. On 6 December, he scored his first brace for Roma, which allowed Roma to come back and draw the home match against Sassuolo, which finished 2–2. On 26 February 2015, he scored his first goal in the UEFA Europa League for the club, the opener in a 2–1 win away to Feyenoord. He concluded the season with 41 appearances and 9 goals, making him the club's second-highest goalscorer of the season, after Francesco Totti.

Loan to Internazionale
On 31 August 2015, Ljajić signed for Internazionale on a season-long loan, with Inter paying Roma €1.75 million and including an option to make the transfer permanent at the end of the season for €11 million. On 1 December 2015, Ljajić scored his first Inter goal in a 2–1 away loss to Napoli.

Torino
After Inter opted not to exercise their purchase option, Ljajić was sold to Torino on 18 July 2016 for €8.5 million, plus €500,000 in potential bonuses.

Beşiktaş
On 31 August 2018, Ljajić joined Turkish Süper Lig club Beşiktaş on a season-long loan. On 29 May 2019, Beşiktaş signed Ljajić on a permanent deal for a reported fee of €6.5 million.

Fatih Karagümrük
On 28 September 2022, Ljajić joined Fatih Karagümrük on a one-and-a-half-year contract. He only became available for the team's official matches starting January 2023.

International career

Ljajić represented the Serbia under-17 and under-19 teams. On 7 September 2008, he made his international debut for the under-21 squad in a European Championship qualification match against Hungary. On 26 October 2010, it was announced by Serbia coach Vladimir Petrović that Ljajić would receive his first senior call-up against Bulgaria in a friendly match on 17 November 2010.

Ljajić was removed from his country's squad by head coach Siniša Mihajlović after refusing to sing the Serbian national anthem in a 2–0 friendly loss against Spain on 28 May 2012 due to personal reasons. Ljajić previously signed a code of conduct established by Mihajlović that included, among other things, to sing the Serbian national anthem, "Bože pravde" (God of Justice). Ljajić confirmed Mihajlović's statement, also claiming he loves Serbia and that he has a will to play for its national team, but added he must respect himself, implying he was no longer going to play under Mihajlović.

On 17 February 2014, the new head coach of Serbian national team, Ljubinko Drulović, said he would not require players to sing the national anthem but to give their all for their country on the field. Ljajić scored his first goal for the senior side on 7 June 2015 in a 4–1 friendly win against Azerbaijan.

In June 2018, Ljajić was included in the 23-man Serbian squad for the 2018 FIFA World Cup in Russia, where he played in all three group matches as Serbia was eliminated during the group stage.

Personal life

Ljajić is an ethnic Bosniak, and a practising Muslim.

Career statistics

Club

International

Scores and results list Serbia's goal tally first, score column indicates score after each Ljajić goal.

Honours
Partizan
Serbian SuperLiga: 2008–09
Serbian Cup: 2008–09

Beşiktaş
 Turkish Super League: 2020–21
 Türkiye Kupası: 2020–21

References

External links

1991 births
Living people
Sportspeople from Novi Pazar
Serbian footballers
Association football midfielders
Association football forwards
Serbia international footballers
Serbia youth international footballers
Serbia under-21 international footballers
2018 FIFA World Cup players
FK Partizan players
ACF Fiorentina players
A.S. Roma players
Inter Milan players
Torino F.C. players
Beşiktaş J.K. footballers
Fatih Karagümrük S.K. footballers
Serbian SuperLiga players
Serie A players
Süper Lig players
Serbian Muslims
Serbian expatriate footballers
Expatriate footballers in Italy
Expatriate footballers in Turkey
Serbian expatriate sportspeople in Italy
Serbian expatriate sportspeople in Turkey
Bosniaks of Serbia